National Fallen Firefighters Memorial since 1990 is officially designated by the United States Congress as the National Memorial to career and volunteer fallen firefighters. Located in Emmitsburg, Maryland, it was conceived as a tribute to American fire service. The memorial was constructed in 1981 on the campus of the National Fire Academy. Plaques listing the names of firefighters encircle the plaza from the same year. When a firefighter dies on duty, local fire officials notify the United States Fire Administration and a notice is immediately posted on the Memorial grounds. The flags over the Memorial are flown at half-staff in honor of the fallen firefighter. If some criteria are met, the fallen firefighter is honored at the annual memorial service. The Memorial is open to the public throughout the year.

On October 16, 2001, President George W. Bush approved legislation requiring the United States flag to be lowered to half-staff on all federal buildings to memorialize fallen firefighters. Public Law 107-51 requires this action to occur annually in conjunction with observance of the National Fallen Firefighters Memorial Service.  The date of the National Fallen Firefighters Memorial Service is traditionally the first Sunday in October. A candlelight vigil service is held the night before the National Fallen Firefighters Memorial Service. Both services are held at the National Fallen Firefighters Memorial. These services memorialize Fallen Firefighters from around the nation. In 2020, due to the Coronavirus (COVID-19) pandemic, the Foundation held a virtual ceremony to remember Fallen firefighters.

See also
 List of firefighting monuments and memorials
 List of national memorials of the United States
 New York State Fallen Firefighters Memorial
 IAFF Fallen Fire Fighters Memorial

References

External links
Official website
 President's Speech at 20th Annual National Fallen Firefighters Memorial Tribute

1981 establishments in Maryland
Buildings and structures in Frederick County, Maryland
Buildings and structures completed in 1981
Emmitsburg, Maryland
Firefighting memorials
Firefighting in the United States
Monuments and memorials in Maryland
National Memorials of the United States
Monuments and memorials on the National Register of Historic Places in Maryland